Samaara is a 2006 Sri Lankan Sinhala romantic thriller film directed by Sanjaya Nirmal and produced by Soma Edirisinghe for EAP Films. It stars Kamal Addaraarachchi and Kanchana Mendis in lead roles along with Semini Iddamalgoda and child actress Sandali Welikanne. Music composed by Rohana Weerasinghe. It is the 1070th Sri Lankan film in the Sinhala cinema.

Plot

The film revolves around Samara, a little girl and her mother Indu. Indu is a music loving young mother living with her only child separated from her lover Shane. Being defeated in love Indu has not given up having hopes and dreams. But her dream is shattered when she meets with an accident on her way to a practical test in music.

One Day, Her bike collides with a car driven by young doctor Kalana. Indu is prevented from going for the test and Kalana sympathizes with her. He is attracted to Indu not knowing that she is a mother. Ruwina, Kalana's intended wife who hears this, prevents him from meeting Indu or helping her. Kalana ignores her and buy a new violin for Indu. Kalana shocks after learning Indu's truth, but they fall in love eventually. Kalana and Indu get married.

Soon, Indu's ex-fiancé, Shane sees her and follows her. Once he meet Indu in her home, he learns that Samara is his daughter. Shane shocks and demands Indu to give Samara to him when Indu refuses. Shane kidnaps Samara to get custody of her. Samara faints as she scared and Shane admits her to hospital. Indu and Kalana come to hospital and meet Samara. But Samara dies, leaving Shane arrested and shock for Indu.

3 months later, Kalana and Indu's marriage seems to fall apart due to Samara's death. Kalana becomes rude to Indu who lives remembering Samara always. Kalana wins a scholarship in London for 7 years, leaving Indu breakdown. Kalana bids farewell to her. However, Kalana sees Samara in dream in airport while Indu dreams same in home. Kalana comes back to Indu, cancelling his scholarship as realizing he can't leave Indu. Finally, Indu and Kalana reunited.

Cast
 Sandali Welikanne as Samara
 Kanchana Mendis as Indu
 Kamal Addararachchi as Dr. Kalana
 Buddhika Jayaratne as Shane
 Semini Iddamalgoda as Ruwina
 Buddhadasa Vithanarachchi as Indu's father
 Iranganie Serasinghe as Indu's paternal grandmother
 Seetha Kumari as a friend of Indu's grandmother
 Nelum Perera
 Soma Mawalage
 Nilanthi Wijesinghe as Kalana's mother
 Tyrone Michael as Kalana's father
 Milton Jayawardena
 Nita Fernando as Dancing teacher
 Ruwan Wickramasinghe
 Piyumi Shanika

References

2006 films
2000s Sinhala-language films